The National Canal Museum is the Signature Program of the Delaware & Lehigh National Heritage Corridor, specifically in Easton, Pennsylvania.

After a three-year transition during which the Delaware & Lehigh National Heritage Corridor operated the canal museum under a management agreement, the two merged to become one. The D&L is now responsible for The National Canal Museum and for Hugh Moore Park, The Emrick Technology Center, Locktender's House Museum and the canal boat ride, Josiah White II.

Officially known as Hugh Moore Historical Park & Museums, the National Canal Museum is located in Easton's Hugh Moore Park.

History 
The National Canal Museum opened in 1970 as a joint cooperative effort between the City of Easton's Hugh Moore Park Commission and the Pennsylvania Canal Society.  Sitting at the fork between the Delaware and Lehigh Rivers, this small Museum was intended to highlight and operate Hugh Moore Park.

The museum had been a destination for people interested in the canal, as well as school trips looking for information about transportation.  In 1978 with the addition of the Josiah White, the canal boat ride became a distinctive part of a visit to the National Canal Museum.

In 1982 The museum's exhibits were redesigned to make the museum a National Museum of the towpath canal era.  This redesign also acted as a catalyst for the expansion into the industrial heritage of the Lehigh Valley.

During this period, the National Canal Museum began hosting several major events, including the annual Canal Festival and annual Canal History and Technology Symposium, the latter being held at Lafayette College.  By 1985, the museum was realizing the ability for a complete collection and archival ability of important artifacts of both the canal era and the industrial revolution.

In 1996, the National Canal Museum moved to downtown Easton into Two Rivers Landing in an effort to revitalize the downtown district.  Since that time, Two Rivers Landing receives an average of 250,000 visitors each year.  Beginning in 2002, the museum began a campaign to recreate the museum to add hands-on activities to the existing exhibits.  A proposal to the National Science Foundation(NSF) resulted in a grant of $1.4 Million, later supplemented to $2 million for the creation of exhibits based on their proposal "Science and Technology of Canals and Inland Waterways."

This led to a new exhibit space installed in March 2006, incorporating the history, science, and technology of canal construction and navigation.

At the end of 2011, the 15-year lease period in Two Rivers Landing ended and was not renewed.  On January 1, 2012, the museum was relocated back to the canal in Hugh Moore Park, repurposing the Emrick Technology Center to act as the main exhibit and administrative space during the Crayola Factory shutdown.

In 2013, the Delaware & Lehigh National Heritage Corridor began operating the National Canal Museum under a management agreement during the first Crayola Experience opening. This marked the beginning of a three-year transition in which the two organizations would become one. The transition allowed the D&L to integrate the management, finance, marketing, and development functions of the two organizations. The merger of the two in 2017 culminated this transition period. The museum, along with the other operations of Hugh Moore Historical Park & Museums, is now the Signature Program of the D&L.

Collections
The museum's collections reflect the material culture and document the history of America's canals and navigable rivers, as well as canal-related industries in the Lehigh Valley. The museum's holdings include 3,753 artifacts; 3,890 reels of film, video cassettes and audio (oral history) tapes; 52,782 slides, photographs and negative images; 31,824 engineering drawings; a library of more than 13,483 volumes; 736 linear feet of manuscript materials; and 261 rolls of microfilm. Among the museum's archival holdings are rare film footage of canal life, historic photographs, canal maps, captain's logs, a complete set of the Army Corps of Engineers' annual reports to Congress, and engineering plans for 15 towpath canals east of the Mississippi River.

NCM is responsible for maintaining and interpreting the historic structures and sites within the 260 acres that comprise Hugh Moore Park, a National Register Historic District. These include Section 8 of the Lehigh Canal and its three operating locks, a locktender's house, ruins from three 19th century industrial areas, and the remains of the Change Bridge, one of the first iron cable suspension bridges constructed in America.

Accreditations and affiliations
The National Canal Museum is accredited by American Alliance of Museums and is an affiliate of the Smithsonian Institution

Hugh Moore Park
Hugh Moore Park is a City of Easton park nestled between the Lehigh River, and the Lehigh Canal. The area now known as Hugh Moore Park was originally an industrial park, built due to the large amount of anthracite coal being brought down the Lehigh Canal from present day Jim Thorpe, Pennsylvania

The park was purchased by the City of Easton in 1962, using money donated by Hugh Moore.  This sparked the formation of the Pennsylvania Canal Society in 1966, and eventually led to the creation of the National Canal Museum.  Through the course of several master plans for the part, improvements to the park and its facilities have continually enhanced visitor experience.
These improvements include a bike/hiking trail, boat launch, pavilions, as well as preservation of industrial ruins and three locks, including the only working lift lock in Pennsylvania and New Jersey

The Delaware & Lehigh National Heritage Corridor, which has merged with The National Canal Museum, is responsible for maintaining and interpreting the historic structures and sites within the  that comprise Hugh Moore Park (ignoring water surface), a National Register Historic District. These include Section 8 of the Lehigh Canal and its three operating locks, a locktender's house, ruins from three 19th-century industrial areas, and the Change Bridge, one of the first iron cable suspension bridges constructed in America.

The Emrick Center
The building holds a reception area, exhibit spaces, offices, and the Hugh Moore Park and Museums Archives.

The building opened in 2007.  The inaugural exhibit, "From this Valley: Iron, Steel and the Birthplace of the American Industrial Revolution," tells the story of the Lehigh Valley's emergence as a powerhouse of industrial might. In 2012, the National Canal Museum relocated from Two Rivers Landing to the Emrick Center, and transferred most of the exhibits and hands-on educational activity stations there. The relocated Museum, which is adjacent to the mule-drawn canal boat, the Josiah White II, opened on Memorial Day weekend, 2012. It came under operation of the Delaware & Lehigh National Heritage Corridor in 2013 and in 2017 completed its merger with them.

Archives
Also currently held in the Emrick Technology Center is the archives of the National Canal Museum.  Since the inception of the institution and through all of its incarnations, and beginning with the first master plan, there has been provisions for the National Canal Museum to preserve the transportation and industrial history of the area.  Since 1985 and the acquisition of property for this purpose, the collection has undergone rapid growth, and is now the premier site for information concerning canal transportation in America and technology of the Lehigh Valley

The museum's collection reflect these areas, and document the history of America's canals and navigable rives, as well as the related industries in the Lehigh Valley. According to the museum website:
"The museum's holdings include: 3,753 artifacts; 3,890 reels of film, video cassettes [sic.], and audio (oral history) tapes; 52,782 slides, photographs and negative images; 31,824 engineering drawings; a library of more than 13,483 volumes; 736 linear feet of manuscript materials; and 261 rolls of microfilm."

In addition to the large amount of historical artifacts and data, the museum also employs an in-house historian, available for lectures, researchers, and inquiries.

Locktender's House

The Locktender's House, with a museum on the first floor, is a restored locktender's house nestled between the Lehigh River and Guard Lock 8 on the Lehigh Canal.  The Locktender's House represents the living and working conditions of people from the 19th and early 20th centuries.

The Locktender's House was built for the person with the responsibility of operating the lock.  In order to ensure that lock was operated, the house was constructed as near to the lock as possible.  Because of this, the opinion was that there was no reason for someone in the house to be unable to come out and operate the lock.

Opened in 1974, this museum is decorated period appropriately and is meant to provide a rough equivalent of what working on the canal would entail.  Costumed guides provide background and information during a tour of the rooms of the house.

Josiah White II
The Josiah White II is the current boat used for the Canal Boat ride.  It is a steel-hulled boat built in 1993 by Bethlehem Steel at the Sparrows Point shipyard in Maryland.

The original canal boat, named the Josiah White, served operationally during the summer from 1978 until 1993, when it was allowed to sink near the feeder gate for the canal.  It currently serves as a visual aid for the canal boat ride

The canal boat ride was developed to provide context and historical information to the canal, including information about building, living, and working on the canal.  Pulled by two mules, named Hank and George, the ride attempts to recreate the feel of moving down the canal during its operational period.  Average rides are 40 minutes long, and discuss a multitude of topics which usually include:
Mules
Mule Tenders
Features of the canal
History of the canal

Timeline: Hugh Moore Historical Park & Museums

See also 
Canal
Delaware Canal
Delaware and Lehigh National Heritage Corridor
Lock (water transport)
Lehigh Canal
Canvass White

References

External links 
  National Canal Museum Website
  Delaware & Lehigh National Heritage Corridor
  Smithsonian Affiliations Web Site

Museums in Northampton County, Pennsylvania
History museums in Pennsylvania
Transportation museums in Pennsylvania
Institutions accredited by the American Alliance of Museums
Museums established in 1970
Canal museums in the United States
Technology museums in the United States
Industry museums in Pennsylvania
Association of Science-Technology Centers member institutions
Canal Museum
Easton, Pennsylvania